Bruno Ortiz-Cañavate Ozeki (born 15 February 1993) is a Spanish swimmer. He competed in the men's 4 × 100 metre freestyle relay event at the 2016 Summer Olympics.

References

External links
 

1993 births
Living people
Olympic swimmers of Spain
Swimmers at the 2016 Summer Olympics
Place of birth missing (living people)
Spanish male freestyle swimmers
Michigan Wolverines men's swimmers